is the 21st single by Japanese idol girl group AKB48, released on May 25, 2011.

Release information
The first presses of the single came with a ticket to vote in the AKB48 22nd Single Senbatsu Election (to choose the members to be featured in the next AKB48's single, to be released in the summer).

"Everyday, Katyusha" was used as the theme song for the film Moshidora, which stars AKB48 members Atsuko Maeda and Minami Minegishi, and the song "Yankee Soul" will be the title track for the television drama Majisuka Gakuen 2 by TV Tokyo. It was announced that part of the proceeds from this album will be donated to help the victims of the 2011 Tōhoku earthquake and tsunami. "Everyday, Katyusha" sold a total of 942,475 copies on its release day alone, and it set a new sales record with sales of 1.33 million albums on its debut week.

Track listing

Contributing members

"Everyday, Katyusha"

Center: Atsuko Maeda
 Team A: Aika Oota, Asuka Kuramochi , Haruna Kojima, Rino Sashihara, Mariko Shinoda, Aki Takajo, Minami Takahashi, Atsuko Maeda
 Team K: Tomomi Itano, Yuko Oshima, Ayaka Kikuchi, Minami Minegishi, Sae Miyazawa, Yui Yokoyama
 Team B: Tomomi Kasai, Yuki Kashiwagi, Rie Kitahara, Mika Komori, Sumire Sato, Yuka Masuda, Miho Miyazaki, Mayu Watanabe
 Team S (SKE48): Jurina Matsui, Rena Matsui
 Team N (NMB48): Sayaka Yamamoto, Miyuki Watanabe

"Korekara Wonderland"
 Team A: Haruna Kojima, Rino Sashihara, Mariko Shinoda, Aki Takajo, Minami Takahashi, Atsuko Maeda
 Team K: Tomomi Itano, Yuko Oshima, Minami Minegishi, Sae Miyazawa, Yui Yokoyama
 Team B: Tomomi Kasai, Yuki Kashiwagi, Rie Kitahara, Mayu Watanabe

"Yankee Soul"
 Team A: Aika Ota, Asuka Kuramochi, Haruna Kojima, Rino Sashihara, Mariko Shinoda, Aki Takajo, Minami Takahashi, Atsuko Maeda, Ami Maeda
 Team K: Sayaka Akimoto, Tomomi Itano, Yuko Oshima, Ayaka Kikuchi, Moeno Nito, Minami Minegishi, Sae Miyazawa, Yui Yokoyama
 Team B: Tomomi Kasai, Yuki Kashiwagi, Rie Kitahara, Mika Komori, Sumire Sato, Miho Miyazaki, Mayu Watanabe
 Team Kenkyuusei: Mina Oba, Haruka Shimazaki, Haruka Shimada, Mariya Nagao, Suzuran Yamauchi, Miori Ichikawa
 Team S (SKE48): Jurina Matsui, Rena Matsui

"Hito no Chikara"
"Hito no Chikara " was performed by Undergirls. The center performers are  Amina Sato and Haruka Nakagawa.

 Team A: Misaki Iwasa, Shizuka Oya, Haruka Katayama, Haruka Nakagawa, Chisato Nakata, Sayaka Nakaya, Natsumi Matsubara
 Team K: Mayumi Uchida, Ayaka Umeda, Miku Tanabe, Tomomi Nakatsuka, Reina Fujie, Sakiko Matsui, Rumi Yonezawa
 Team B: Haruka Ishida, Kana Kobayashi, Amina Sato, Natsuki Sato, Mariya Suzuki, Rina Chikano, Natsumi Hirajima
 Team Kenkyuusei: Miyu Takeuchi, Mariko Nakamura, Anna Mori, Shiori Nakamata
 Team S (SKE48): Kumi Yagami
 Team KII (SKE48): Akane Takayanagi, Manatsu Mukaida
 Team N (NMB48): Nana Yamada

"Anti"
"Anti" was performed by Team Kenkyūsei which consisted of the following members:
 9th Generation: Mina Oba, Haruka Shimazaki, Haruka Shimada, Miyu Takeuchi, Mariya Nagao, Mariko Nakamura, Anna Mori, Suzuran Yamauchi
 10th Generation: Maria Abe, Rina Izuta, Miori Ichikawa, Anna Iriyama, Rena Kato, Yuki Kanazawa, Marina Kobayashi, Nakamata Shiori, Nana Fujita
 11th Generation: Sara Ushikubo, Rina Kawaei, Natsuki Kojima, Shihori Suzuki, Wakana Natori, Ayaka Morikawa, Nau Yamaguchi

Reception
"Everyday, Katyusha" set a new sales record for singles in Japan, selling a total of 1.334 million singles on its debut week and beating the previous record set by Mr. Children in February 1996. The single is also the third million-selling single by the band AKB48, together with their previous singles "Sakura no Ki ni Narō" with sales of 1.15 million album and "Beginner" with sales of 1.07 million albums. The single also crossed the 1.5 million album sales mark, becoming the fifth single by a female group to cross that mark. It also achieved that mark at a record pace, and it also became the first single since 2005 to achieve that mark.

Charts and certifications

Charts

Sales and certifications

Awards

References

2011 singles
AKB48 songs
Songs with lyrics by Yasushi Akimoto
Oricon Weekly number-one singles
Billboard Japan Hot 100 number-one singles
RIAJ Digital Track Chart number-one singles
King Records (Japan) singles
Japanese film songs